Keşlə (Кешлә, کشله; also Keshly, Keshlya, Kəşlə, Keşlä, Kešlæ, Kishly, Kishlya, Kishty, Kişli  and Kitly) is a settlement and municipality in Baku, Azerbaijan.  It has a population of 25,626. The Keshla area is becoming main business district of Baku, Azerbaijan. In the North, it is surrounded by several skyscrapers which are located at H. Aliyev Avenue. However in the South it is neighboring with Baku White City.

History 
The name Keshla is first mentioned in sources in the 17th century. The former name was Keshlaqishlag. Oykonim reflects the name of the Keshli / Keshla tribe of Turkic origin. The document of the XVIII century provides information about the right of Keshli and Karamanli tribes to use Gazakhli, Alasli and Borchali pastures. 

The refinery district was about 8 miles (13 km) from the shipping ports. An industrial area plan was completed in 1876. Some of the farms and pastures of the neighbouring village of Keshla were zoned to accommodate replacements for factories that had been dismantled in the city.

The settlement, located in the Nizami district of Baku, was established in 1936, and since 1939 has been part of Baku, first as an urban massif, and since 1991 as an independent settlement. Its population has exceeded 100,000 people. Most of the population's jobs are in industry and trade. There is a machine-building plant and social facilities. The meaning of the toponym is explained as "plain", "wide valley". It is studied in detail in the book "Keshla and Keshlaliler" written by Veli Habiboglu Majidov. There was access to Shirvanshah's palace from the settlement. Until recently, the remains of the Keshla fortress were visible in the settlement. There is a 17th century mosque here. Keshla village. - The real name of the village is Qishla. Over time, this word took the form of Keshla. This village was closely connected with Baku khans. The khans' horses, cattle and sheep were kept in the winter.

Sport 
Azerbaijani professional football club Keşla based in Keshla. The club has won the Premier League title twice.

Places of interest
Museums and historical places
Villa Petrolea

Sport venues
ASK Arena

Religious buildings
Shah Abbas Mosque (Keshla)

Shopping malls
Metropark Shopping Mall

Tall buildings
Baku Tower
SOCAR Tower

Image gallery

See also 
Baku Tower
Baku White City
Villa Petrolea
List of tallest buildings in Azerbaijan

References 

Populated places in Baku